In Harmony is the third album by the Japanese J-pop band Bright, released on 20 October 2010. The album was released in two versions: a CD+DVD and a CD only version. The song "Flower" was the theme song for the BeeTV program "キス× Kiss×キス" (KisuxKissxKisu; KissxKissXKiss), and "Shining Star" soundtracked a TV commercial for Shidax. The DVD contains music videos and live versions of several songs on the album.

Track listing
Disc 1 (CD)
Xiao Yin
あの日の雨
Flower　
Baby Sweet
Shining Star　
Kirai demo Suki: Aishiteru (キライ…でも好き 〜アイシテル〜)
Brightest Star: A Cappella Version
I’ll Be There: Symphony Orchestra Session
Curtain Call: I'll Be There

Disc 2 (DVD)
Flower Music Video
Flower Making Video
Bright 4th Live: Real 2010.3.27　at Namba Hatch Live Video
Opening: Dance with Us
Kirai demo Suki: Aishiteru
Secret
Promise You
Limited Edition:
Bright in Beijing

Charts

References

2010 albums
Bright (Japanese band) albums